Franck Tchiloemba (born January 4, 1973 in Courbevoie, France) is a French basketball player who played for French Pro A league clubs Hyeres-Toulon, Strasbourg, No and paris during 2002-2004 seasons.

References

French men's basketball players
1973 births
Living people
Cholet Basket players
HTV Basket players
Nanterre 92 players
SIG Basket players
Sportspeople from Hauts-de-Seine
People from Courbevoie